Elizabeth Patricia 'Lisa' Gómez Randall (born 21 September 1981) is an American-born Mexican former footballer who played as a defender for the Mexico women's national football team at the 2004 Summer Olympics. At the collegiate level, she played for the University of Miami in the United States.

See also
 Mexico at the 2004 Summer Olympics

References

External links
 

1981 births
Living people
Citizens of Mexico through descent
Mexican women's footballers
Mexico women's international footballers
Place of birth missing (living people)
Footballers at the 2004 Summer Olympics
Olympic footballers of Mexico
Women's association football defenders
American sportspeople of Mexican descent
American women's soccer players
Miami Hurricanes women's soccer players
People from Galliano, Louisiana
Soccer players from Louisiana
Footballers at the 2003 Pan American Games
Pan American Games bronze medalists for Mexico
Medalists at the 2003 Pan American Games
Pan American Games medalists in football